In music, a seven six chord is a chord containing both factors a sixth and a seventh above the root, making it both an added chord and a seventh chord. However, the term may mean the first inversion of an added ninth chord (E–G–C–D).

It can be written as 7/6 and 7,6. It can be represented by the integer notation {0, 4, 7, 9, 10}.

This is known more commonly as the 13th chord, with both the dominant 7th and the 6th (or 13th). The chord therefore contains the 5, 6, 7, & 8 (root), which can be spread or clustered. Playing the 13th note extension (or 6th) without the dominant 7th is known as an Add 6 (+6) chord.

Six seven chord table

References

Seventh chords